Caroline Cooper is a female former swimmer who competed for Great Britain and England.

Swimming career
Cooper represented England at the 1986 Commonwealth Games in Edinburgh, Scotland winning three medals. She won a gold medal in the 100 metres butterfly, a silver medal in the 4 x 100 metres freestyle relay and a gold medal in the 4 x 100 metres medley relay. She also represented Great Britain at the Swimming at the 1986 World Aquatics Championships.

Cooper won the 1985 ASA National Championship title in the 100 metres butterfly after dead-heating with Samantha Purvis.

References

English female swimmers
Swimmers at the 1986 Commonwealth Games
Commonwealth Games medallists in swimming
Commonwealth Games gold medallists for England
Commonwealth Games silver medallists for England
Year of birth missing (living people)
Living people
Medallists at the 1986 Commonwealth Games